The 2022 Heart of America 200 was the eighth stock car race of the 2022 NASCAR Camping World Truck Series and the 24th iteration of the event. The race was held on Saturday, May 14, 2022, in Kansas City, Kansas at Kansas Speedway, a  permanent D-shaped oval racetrack. The race was contested over 134 laps. Zane Smith, driving for Front Row Motorsports, would have a dominant performance, leading 108 laps and earning his sixth career truck series win. It was his third win of the season. To fill out the podium, Ty Majeski of ThorSport Racing and Grant Enfinger of GMS Racing would finish 2nd and 3rd, respectively.

Background 
Kansas Speedway is a  tri-oval race track in the Village West area near Kansas City, Kansas, United States. It was built in 2001 and it currently hosts two annual NASCAR race weekends. The IndyCar Series also held races at the venue until 2011. The speedway is owned and operated by NASCAR.

Entry list 

 (R) denotes rookie driver.
 (i) denotes driver who are ineligible for series driver points.

Notes

Practice 
The only 30-minute practice session was held on Saturday, May 14, at 11:00 AM CST.

Qualifying 
Qualifying was held on Saturday, May 14, at 11:30 AM CST. Since Kansas Speedway is an oval track, the qualifying system used is a single-car, one-lap system with only one round. Whoever sets the fastest time in the round wins the pole.

Since 35 trucks are entered, no one would fail to qualify.

Race results 
Stage 1 Laps: 30

Stage 2 Laps: 30

Stage 3 Laps: 74

Standings after the race 

Drivers' Championship standings

Note: Only the first 10 positions are included for the driver standings.

References 

2022 NASCAR Camping World Truck Series
NASCAR races at Kansas Speedway
Heart of America 200
2022 in sports in Kansas